Adeniran Ogunsanya College of Education, also known as AOCOED, is a higher education institute located in Oto-Awori community in the Oto-Awori area of Ojo, Lagos State. Adeniran Ogunsanya College of Education offers the award of Nigeria Certificate in Education (NCE) and undergraduate first degree courses in Education, having affiliated to Ekiti State University.

History
The college, which was formerly called Lagos State College of Education, was established in 1958 as a Grade III teacher training college, matriculating about ninety students in its first year. In 1982, due to lack of basic infrastructures, modern facilities and increasing population, the college was moved from Surulere to its present site in Oto-Awori.the lagos state lawmaker have turn it to a university in 2022 which is now called lagos state university of education (lasued) along side with Michael otedola college of primary education (mocped) which is now the epe branch of lasued

Notable alumni
 Kunle Ajayi
 Sarah Adebisi Sosan
 Oladipo Simeon Adebayo

Schools in Adeniran Ogunsanya College of Education
There are currently 6 schools in Adeniran Ogunsanya college of education, which are
school of science
school of education
school of art and social science
school of vocational and technical education
school of early childhood and primary education
school of language

Notable faculty
 Afeez Oyetoro

See also

 List of schools in Lagos
 List of colleges of education in Nigeria

References

External links

Education in Lagos State
Universities and colleges in Nigeria